St. Joseph Medical Center (SJMC) is a hospital in Tacoma, Washington. Part of Virginia Mason Franciscan Health, a division of Catholic Health Initiatives, it was the founding Washington operation of the former Franciscan Health System.

History
St. Joseph Medical Center was called St. Joseph Hospital when it was established by the Sisters of St. Francis of Philadelphia in 1891. As a part of the non-profit and faith-based Franciscan Health System, the mission of St. Joseph Medical Center is "to nurture the healing ministry of the Church by bringing it new life, energy and viability in the 21st century. Fidelity to the Gospel urges us to emphasize human dignity and social justice as we move toward the creation of healthier communities."

In 1969, an expansion was undertaken by Bertrand Goldberg to provide an additional 260 beds.

Services
As a Level II trauma center, SJMC's services include 24-hour emergency medical care. In 2013 the hospital opened an upgraded Level III NICU that operates in conjunction with Seattle Children's hospital. SJMC offers inpatient and outpatient medical and surgical services; heart and vascular care; orthopedic services; rehabilitation services; cancer care; diagnostic imaging; physical, speech and occupational therapies; hospice; and a voluntary admit adult inpatient mental health program.

See also
 List of hospitals in Washington (state)

References

External links
St. Joseph Medical Center official site
Sisters of St. Francis of Philadelphia official site
Washington State Hospital Association official site
Virginia Mason Franciscan Health official site

Hospitals in Washington (state)
Franciscan hospitals
Buildings and structures in Tacoma, Washington
Hospitals established in 1891
Bertrand Goldberg buildings
Catholic hospitals in North America